The Mind Body Spirit Festival  is a festival that first took place at the Olympia Exhibition Centre in London in 1977. It was founded by Graham Wilson, together with Terry Ellis, and is now under the stewardship of Melvyn Carlile and Josh Roberts. The festival focused on topics such as religion, the paranormal, spirituality, natural healing, consciousness, and personal growth. The show returned to Olympia in 2015, and continues to focus on topics related to wellbeing. 

Today, visitors from the UK and abroad attend the celebrations in London Olympia and Birmingham NEC, attracted by a mix of musicians, international workshop leaders, authors, artists, and exhibitors.

The Mind Body Spirit Festival was subsequently presented in New York City, Los Angeles, Cork, San Francisco, Sydney, Melbourne and in other major cities, often using the Mind Body Spirit name and following the same formula of exhibitors, authors, and authorities giving lectures and workshops, as well as a mix of  music and performances.

The Festival now incorporates The London Wellbeing Festival in May and The Birmingham Wellbeing Festival in November.

Exhibitors have included the Hare Krishna devotees, Neals Yard, Buddhist groups, astrologers, tarot readers, vegetarians, vegans, t'ai chi groups, the Anthroposophical Society, yoga practitioners, and many others.

External links
 Official site

New Age
Festivals in London